Middlethorpe is a hamlet in the East Riding of Yorkshire, England. It lies to the southeast of the A614 road and consists principally of Middlethorpe Farm.

Middlethorpe forms part of the civil parish of Londesborough.

References

Hamlets in the East Riding of Yorkshire